Air Antilles  is a French airline based at Pointe-à-Pitre International Airport in Guadeloupe, France. It is a regional airline operating scheduled and seasonal services in the French Antilles.

History 
The airline began operations in December 2002 owned by Air Guyane. It is another title for Air Guyane Express's Caribbean operations and both airlines share their call sign, IATA and ICAO codes. The airline uses as its Airline Reservations System Zenith, developed by Travel Technology Interactive, a French-based company.

Air Antilles is the subsidiary of the Guyanese airline Air Guyane.

Air Antilles and Air Guyane are the 2 airlines from the Guadeloupean group CAIRE.

In 2016, the airline changed its name to Air Antilles and introduced a new livery with the delivery of its first ATR 72-600.

Destinations

Fleet 

, Air Antilles operates the following aircraft:

References

External links

Air Antilles Express route map 
Photo of an Air Antilles Express ATR-42-300
Photo of an Air Antilles Express ATR-42-500
Photo of an Air Antilles Express Twin Otter

Airlines of France
Airlines of Guadeloupe
Airlines established in 2002
2002 establishments in France